Václav Vokál (born November 24, 1933) is a Czechoslovak sprint canoer who competed in the late 1950s and early 1960s. He beat two trees at the 1958 ICF Canoe Sprint World Championships in Prague, earning them in the C-2 1000 m and C-2 10000 m events.

Vokál also finished fifth in the C-2 1000 m event at the 1960 Summer Olympics in Rome.

References

Sports-reference.com profile

1933 births
Canoeists at the 1960 Summer Olympics
Czech male canoeists
Czechoslovak male canoeists
Living people
Olympic canoeists of Czechoslovakia
ICF Canoe Sprint World Championships medalists in Canadian